Pedro Garay (born 20 May 1982) is a Paraguayan long-distance runner from Minga Guazú in Alto Paraná.

He is tied to Ciudad del Este based track and field club Asociación de Atletismo del Alto Paraná and has been crowned champion several times of National Marathons.

Garay represented Paraguay at the 2014 South American Cross Country Championships, as well as the 2016 South American Half Marathon Championships and the 2016 South American Marathon Championships..

Career

2013
In October 2013, Garay finished in first position of the Fourth Annual Friends of the Road Race of Brazil, in the 5 km event.

2014
In September 2014, Garay finished in fifth position of The Third International Run of the ABC Color Newspaper, fulfilling 10 km in 33m 01s. In November 2014, Garay participated in the first edition of the International Run of Ciudad del Este, organized by one of the commercial attractions Shopping Zuni, a shopping centre. On 23 February 2014, Garay represented Paraguay at the 2014 South American Cross Country Championships. Individually, Garay finished in 21st position with a time of 41:55.08 in the Senior men's race of 12 km.

2015
In January 2015, Garay obtained fifth position in the 2015 Cross Country National Championships running 12k in 44.36.44. In May 2015, Garay finished in first position of an international competition, Media Marathon disputed in Asunción, fulfilling 5 km in 16min 26 sec in front of the Argentine Pablo Arguello who fulfilled 16m.27s. The competition was supported by the Embassy of South Korea, The National Secretary of Sport, the Paraguay Marathon Club and the Olympic Committee of Paraguay. In August 2015, Garay was crowned champion of the Suply Run, a 5 km National Marathon disputed in the city of Asunción, completing 5 km in 15 minutes and 41 seconds. In October 2015, Garay finished in first position of a district Marathon disputed in Hernandarias in Alto Paraná. During 2015, Garay participated in monthly National Evaluative Tournaments of the Federación Paraguaya de Atletismo.

2016
In 2016, concludes the Paraguayan National Cross Country Championships in third position with a time of 00:35:42.51.

Competition record

International competitions

National championships

References

People from Alto Paraná Department
Paraguayan male long-distance runners
1982 births
Living people
21st-century Paraguayan people